Kačaniklić , is a Serbian surname. Notable people with the surname include:

Alexander Kačaniklić (born 1991), Swedish footballer 
Robin Kačaniklić (born 1988), Swedish footballer, brother of Alexander

Serbian surnames